David Grigoryan (born on 28 December 1982 in Yerevan, Soviet Union) is an Armenian football defender. He is currently unattached. Grigoryan was also a member of the Armenia national football team, and has participated in eight international matches since his debut in an away friendly match against Hungary on 18 February 2004.

National team statistics

External links
 

1982 births
Living people
Armenian footballers
Armenia international footballers
Armenian expatriate footballers
FC Mika players
FC Kyzylzhar players
Ulisses FC players
FC Ararat Yerevan players
Armenian Premier League players
Kazakhstan Premier League players
Expatriate footballers in Kazakhstan
Armenian expatriate sportspeople in Kazakhstan
Footballers from Yerevan
Association football defenders